Hurricane Stan was the deadliest tropical cyclone of the 2005 Atlantic hurricane season. A relatively weak system that affected areas of Central America and Mexico in early October 2005, Stan was the eighteenth named storm and eleventh hurricane of the 2005 season, having formed from a tropical wave on October 1 after it had moved into the western Caribbean. The depression slowly intensified, and reached tropical storm intensity the following day, before subsequently making its first landfall on the Yucatán Peninsula. While traversing the peninsula, the tropical storm weakened, but was able to re-intensify once it entered the Bay of Campeche. Under favorable conditions for tropical development, Stan attained hurricane strength on October 4, and later reached peak intensity with winds of 80 mph (130 km/h) and a minimum barometric pressure of 977 mbar (hPa; 28.85 inHg). The hurricane maintained this intensity until landfall near Punta Roca Partida, Mexico later the same day. Once over the mountainous terrain of Mexico, however, Stan quickly weakened, and dissipated on October 5.

Due to Stan's position within a large area of convective activity and thunderstorms, the hurricane's effects were far-reaching and widespread across Central America. Flash floods generated by the hurricane caused severe crop losses, particularly to coffee crops. Overall, Stan caused at least 1,668 deaths across six countries, with many others unaccounted for. Most of these fatalities occurred in Guatemala, and were mostly caused by mudslides triggered by torrential rainfall. The floods in Guatemala destroyed entire towns and disrupted exportation of petroleum. In Mexico, the heavy rains triggered additional mudslides and caused rivers to overflow, flooding nearby villages. Despite being relatively far from Stan as opposed to other countries, El Salvador was also severely affected by the hurricane. The Santa Ana Volcano erupted while Stan was producing heavy rains in the country, which contributed to the damage already wrought by mudslides. Transportation in the country was disrupted. Across the region, Stan caused $3.9 billion in damages, primarily due to torrential rainfall.

Meteorological history

Hurricane Stan originated from a tropical wave that was first identified by the National Hurricane Center (NHC) off the west coast of Africa on September 17, 2005. Traveling westward, the wave remained weak, barely being notable. By September 22 convection began to increase; however, wind shear in the region prevented this development from continuing. The system entered the Caribbean several days later, a region with more favorable conditions for cyclonic development. Intermittent convection formed around the wave as it moved west-northwestward before the development maintained itself. On October 1, the system had become sufficiently organized for the NHC to classify it as Tropical Depression Twenty, with the center of circulation situated roughly 135 mi (215 km) southeast of Cozumel, Mexico.

Located to the south of a low to mid-level tropospheric ridge, the depression tracked towards the west-northwest. Within a few hours of being warned upon, the system further intensified into Tropical Storm Stan. This followed the development of a strong convective banding feature to the southeast of the storm's center. Around 1000 UTC (5 a.m. CDT) on October 2, Stan made its first landfall near Punta Hualaxtoc, Mexico, roughly 35 mi (55 km) south of Tulum, with winds of 40 mph (65 km/h).  Over the following 18 hours, the weak storm traversed the southern portion of the Yucatán Peninsula. Upon entering the Gulf of Mexico on October 3, Stan had weakened to a tropical depression; however, convection began to redevelop over the storm's center, allowing the system to re-attain tropical storm status.

A strong area of high pressure over the western Gulf of Mexico forced the storm to turn southwestward, back to the Mexican coastline. Increasingly deep cloud cover formed over the storm in response to a favorable environment over the Bay of Campeche. Late on October 3, forecasters at National Hurricane Center noted a statistical rapid intensity index indicating a 49% chance of Stan undergoing rapid intensification before its final landfall. This intensification did take place within 12 hours before the hurricane moved onshore. Following this development, National Hurricane Center upgraded the storm to a Category 1 hurricane on the Saffir–Simpson hurricane scale. Around 1200 UTC on October 4, Stan made landfall near Punta Roca Partida, with winds of 80 mph (130 km/h). The storm also attained its lowest barometric pressure of 977 mbar (hPa) at this time. Not long after moving over the mountainous terrain of central Mexico, Stan rapidly weakened to a tropical depression and fully dissipated early on October 5 over the state of Oaxaca.

Preparations
Some 100,000 inhabitants of the Sierra de los Tuxtlas region on the Gulf Coast were evacuated from their homes, and incidents of mild flooding as well as wind damage (such as uprooted trees and roofs ripped off houses) were reported from coastal areas of Veracruz, including the port of Veracruz, Boca del Río, San Andrés Tuxtla, Santiago Tuxtla, Minatitlán and Coatzacoalcos, as well as state capital Xalapa further inland. The armed forces evacuated the inhabitants of a dozen or so towns on the coastal plain, between World Heritage Site Tlacotalpan in the west and the lakeside resort of Catemaco in the east.

Impact

Around the time of Stan's existence, torrential rainstorms dropped upwards of 20 inches (500 mm) of rain, causing severe flash floods, mud slides, and crop damage (particularly to the coffee crop which was close to harvest) over portions of Mexico and Central America, including Guatemala, El Salvador, Nicaragua, Honduras, and Costa Rica. Most of the rainstorms were non-tropical in nature and impossible to relate to the hurricane; however, the impact of the larger weather system can be considered as a whole.

Hundreds were reported missing and were feared dead throughout the region. One estimate put the death toll above 2,000 in Guatemala alone. The final death toll will likely never be known due to the extensive decomposition of bodies in the mud.

Most of the reported fatalities were as a result of the flooding and mudslides, although eight of the deaths in Nicaragua were as a result of a boat carrying migrants from Ecuador and Peru that ran ashore. A large portion of the figure comes from one village alone, as a mudslide completely destroyed the village of Panabaj in Guatemala's Sololá department.

Mexico
As a tropical storm, Stan brought torrential rainfall and gusty winds to parts of the Yucatán Peninsula. Flash flooding took place in several areas; however, no loss of life was reported.

As the system progressed inland towards the Sierra Madre del Sur to the west of the Isthmus of Tehuantepec, the states of Oaxaca and Chiapas were affected with torrential rains. Areas of Chiapas near the Guatemalan border were hit hard, particularly the coastal border town of Tapachula. In Tapachula the river overflowed its banks and caused tremendous damage (including the destruction of all the bridges leading in and out of the town), meaning that it was only accessible through the air. The state government reported that 33 rivers broke their banks and that an indeterminate number of homes, upwards of 20 bridges, and other infrastructure were smashed in the storm's wake.

Some areas in the Sierra Norte, in the central state of Puebla, were also flooded. Three people died in a mudslide at Xochiapulco Hill.

In addition, Pemex evacuated 270 employees from its oil platforms in the Gulf of Mexico, although no damage was reported and the plants were restarted.

The Ministry of the Interior declared states of emergency in the worst hit municipalities of five states: Chiapas, Hidalgo, Oaxaca, Puebla, and Veracruz. According to Mexican president Vicente Fox, Hurricane Stan wrought roughly 20 billion pesos (US$1.9 billion) in damage throughout the country.

Honduras
Throughout Honduras, heavy rains produced by Hurricane Stan resulted in seven fatalities and roughly $100 million in losses.

Guatemala

By October 11, 2005, at least 1,500 people were confirmed to have died, and up to 3,000 were believed missing. Many communities were overwhelmed, and the worst single incident appears to have occurred in Panabaj, an impoverished Maya village in the highlands near Lake Atitlán in Sololá department.  This volcanic lake was so overwhelmed by the torrential rains that many of the small, Mayan villages covering the shores experienced landslides from above. Some of the towns were so overwhelmed by the slides that the mayor has declared them graveyards, and all people who are missing are counted as dead. Piedra Grande, a hamlet in the municipality of San Pedro Sacatepéquez, was also destroyed. Floods and mudslides obliterated the community of about 1,400 people, and it was feared that most or all of the population of the community lost their lives. The government stated that it did not know what was going on in the southwest of the country, and particularly in the San Marcos department because a vital bridge was destroyed at El Palmar, Quetzaltenango, cutting the region off from the rest of the country. There were reported petrol shortages, including in Quetzaltenango.

El Salvador
The October 1 eruption of the Santa Ana volcano, located near the capital San Salvador, compounded the problems, which led to even more destructive floods and mudslides from Stan.

Damage from Stan and the volcano was estimated at $355.6 million (2005 USD), equivalent to 2.2% of the country's GDP from the previous year.

A state of emergency was declared. According to the director of El Salvador's National Emergency Centre, 300 communities were affected by the floods, with over 54,000 people forced to flee their homes. A state of emergency also was called for in Guatemala by President Óscar Berger where 36,559 people were reported in emergency shelters. Some looting was also reported, a scene reminiscent of Hurricane Katrina five weeks previous.

A spokesman for the Salvadoran Red Cross said that "the emergency is bigger than the rescue capacity, we have floods everywhere, bridges about to collapse, landslides and dozens of roads blocked by mudslides". The Pan-American Highway was cut off by mudslides leading into the capital, San Salvador, as well as several other roads. 72 deaths were confirmed in El Salvador.

Retirement 
Following the severe damage and extensive loss of life in Stan's wake, the World Meteorological Organization retired the name Stan from the circulating list of Atlantic hurricane names. For the 2011 season, Stan was replaced by Sean.

See also

 List of Category 1 Atlantic hurricanes
 List of retired Atlantic hurricane names
 Hurricane Mitch (1998) – Second-deadliest Atlantic hurricane on record.
 Hurricane Karl (2010) – Similar storm that affected the same areas as Stan.
 Hurricane Ingrid (2013) – Another storm that, combined with another, wrought devastation across Mexico.
 Timeline of the 2005 Atlantic hurricane season

Footnotes

References

External links

 NHC's archive of Hurricane Stan
 NHC's Tropical Weather Summary through November 2005
 NCDC's Atlantic hurricane season 2005 summary
 Cordinadora Para La Reduccion De Desastres En Guatemala (Conred) Guatemala's Disaster Reduction Institute 
 USAID (US government) information on hurricane/flood relief and recovery efforts
 Al Jazeera: Hundreds die in Guatemala mudslide
 BBC: Guatemala storm deaths increase

Stan (2005)
Stan (2005)
Stan
Stan (2005)
Stan (2005)
2005 in Mexico
2005 in Guatemala
2005 in Honduras
2005 in El Salvador
2005 in Nicaragua
2005 in Costa Rica
Stan
Stan